Die Reise is the third studio album by German singer Max Giesinger. It was released by BMG Rights Management on 23 November 2018 in German-speaking Europe.

Track listing

Charts

Certifications

Release history

References

2018 albums
Max Giesinger albums